Stibine (IUPAC name: stibane) is a chemical compound with the formula SbH3. A pnictogen hydride, this colourless, highly toxic gas is the principal covalent hydride of antimony, and a heavy analogue of ammonia. The molecule is pyramidal with H–Sb–H angles of 91.7° and Sb–H distances of 170.7 pm (1.707 Å). This gas has an offensive smell like hydrogen sulfide (rotten eggs).

Preparation
SbH3 is generally prepared by the reaction of Sb3+ sources with H− equivalents:
2 Sb2O3 + 3 LiAlH4 → 4 SbH3 + 1.5 Li2O + 1.5 Al2O3
4 SbCl3 + 3 NaBH4 → 4 SbH3 + 3 NaCl + 3 BCl3

Alternatively, sources of Sb3− react with protonic reagents (even water) to also produce this unstable gas:
Na3Sb + 3 H2O → SbH3 + 3 NaOH

Properties
The chemical properties of SbH3 resemble those for AsH3. Typical for a heavy hydride (e.g. AsH3, H2Te, SnH4), SbH3 is unstable with respect to its elements. The gas decomposes slowly at room temperature but rapidly at 200 °C:
2 SbH3 → 3 H2 + 2 Sb
The decomposition is autocatalytic and can be explosive.

SbH3 is readily oxidized by O2 or even air:
2 SbH3 + 3 O2 → Sb2O3 + 3 H2O

SbH3 exhibits no basicity, but it can be deprotonated:
SbH3 + NaNH2 → NaSbH2 + NH3

Uses
Stibine is used in the semiconductor industry to dope silicon with small quantities of antimony via the process of chemical vapour deposition (CVD). It has also been used as a silicon dopant in epitaxial layers. Reports claim the use of SbH3 as a fumigant but its instability and awkward preparation contrast with the more conventional fumigant phosphine.

History
As stibine (SbH3) is similar to arsine (AsH3); it is also detected by the Marsh test. This sensitive test detects arsine generated in the presence of arsenic. This procedure, developed circa 1836 by James Marsh, treats a sample with arsenic-free zinc and dilute sulfuric acid: if the sample contains arsenic, gaseous arsine will form. The gas is swept into a glass tube and decomposed by means of heating around 250 – 300 °C. The presence of arsenic is indicated by formation of a deposit in the heated part of the equipment. The formation of a black mirror deposit in the cool part of the equipment indicates the presence of antimony.

In 1837 Lewis Thomson and Pfaff independently discovered stibine. It took some time before the properties of the toxic gas could be determined, partly because a suitable synthesis was not available. In 1876 Francis Jones tested several synthesis methods, but it was not before 1901 when Alfred Stock determined most of the properties of stibine.

Safety
SbH3 is an unstable flammable gas. It is highly toxic, with an LC50 of 100 ppm in mice.

Toxicology

The toxicity of stibine is distinct from that of other antimony compounds, but similar to that of arsine. Stibine binds to the haemoglobin of red blood cells, causing them to be destroyed by the body. Most cases of stibine poisoning have been accompanied by arsine poisoning, although animal studies indicate that their toxicities are equivalent. The first signs of exposure, which can take several hours to become apparent, are headaches, vertigo, and nausea, followed by the symptoms of hemolytic anemia (high levels of unconjugated bilirubin), hemoglobinuria, and nephropathy.

See also
Antimony (Sb)
Arsine (AsH3)
Devarda's alloy, also used to produce arsine and stibine in the lab
List of highly toxic gases
Marsh test, first used to analyse AsH3 and SbH3
James Marsh, invented the Marsh test in 1836
Nascent hydrogen

References

External links
International Chemical Safety Card 0776
NIOSH Pocket Guide to Chemical Hazards

Antimony(III) compounds
Metal hydrides